Hungarian sausages are sausages found in the cuisine of Hungary. Hungary produces a vast number of  sui  sausage types. They may be boiled, fresh or dried, and smoked, with different spices and flavors, "hot" or "mild". Many were influenced by their neighbors and brethren.

These sausages may be eaten like a cold cut or used in a main course. Hungarian cuisine uses these different types of sausages in many ways such as in stews, soups, potato stews like "paprikás krumpli" (paprika-based stew with spicy sausage and potatoes), bean soups like Jókai bableves, some goulash soup variations, pastry dishes, or even in salads.

The smoked sausages may contain bacon, ground pork, beef, boar or lamb, paprika, salt, garlic, black pepper, allspice, white pepper, caraway, nutmeg, zest, marjoram, cayenne pepper, sugar, white wine or cognac. Sausages may have additional ingredients like liver, mushroom, bread, rice, lemon juice, eggs, cream or milk.

The meat is coarsely ground and salted. If garlic is added, it is mashed in water to produce a slurry and added to the meat along with spices. The sausage is then stuffed into natural casings in 1-foot links - usually using the small intestine of the pig. This traditionally took place outside on the fall day when a pig was slaughtered. The sausage is then hung overnight to allow the flavors to meld and some of the grease to drip out. It is now ready to be used fresh and unsmoked. The unsmoked sausages are typically roasted with sauerkraut or red or green cabbage, and served with mashed potatoes.

The dry sausages are cold smoked and hung to cure before consumption.

Sausages

Kolbász

Kolbász is a traditional Hungarian smoked sausage seasoned with paprika. The best known and most popular versions are:

Gyulai sausage is named after the Hungarian town of Gyula, and has PGI protection. It is slow cooked while being beech wood smoked. It is made from pork, 'szalonna' (Hungarian bacon fat), garlic, pepper, caraway, and a Hungarian red paprika. At the World Exhibition of Food in Brussels 1935, the Gyulai kolbász  was awarded a gold diploma. The sausage may be cut into thin slices and eaten alone or with bread. They are also added to many Hungarian dishes including lecsó and potato/egg casserole (rakott krumpli).
Csabai sausage is made in the town Békéscsaba, and also has Protected Geographical Status (PGI) protection. It is similar to Gyulai, but somewhat spicier. There are several variations in size and type, but it is a spicy sausage with a lot of paprika.
Csemege kolbász is an mildly spiced cooked smoked sausage
Cserkész kolbász is a cooked smoked sausage made from beef and pork.
Debreceni kolbász is usually unsmoked or more mildly smoked, with a strong paprika flavour and used for cooking.
Lecsókolbász, a spicy cooked smoked sausage made specifically for serving as part of the dish lecsó, a vegetable stew with peppers and tomatoes.

Hurka
Hurka are boiled sausages that come in two main types "májas" (liver sausage), and "véres" (blood sausage). The main ingredient is liver and rice, or blood and rice.  Spices, pepper and salt are added.

Other cooked sausages

Virsli, a hot dog–like long and thin sausage, consumed boiled with bread and mustard.
Párizsi  (Parizer or Paris sausage), is a much larger, thicker version of virsli. It is very similar to the Bologna.

Szalámi

Hungary's most famous salami is téliszalámi (Winter salami).

See also

 List of dried foods
 List of smoked foods

References 

 Csabai Kolbász

External links 
 Hungarian sausage, (Kolbász)
 Hungarian sausage
 A compilation of sausage recipes

 
Dried meat
Smoked meat